General Petersen may refer to:

Daniel Frederik Petersen (1757–1816), Norwegian Army major general
Erich Petersen (1889–1963), German Luftwaffe general
Frank E. Petersen (1932–2015), U.S. Marine Corps lieutenant general

See also
General Peterson (disambiguation)